The Antonov An-225 Mriya (NATO reporting name: Cossack) was a strategic airlift cargo aircraft designed and produced by the Antonov Design Bureau in the Soviet Union.

It was originally developed during the 1980s as an enlarged derivative of the Antonov An-124 airlifter for the express purpose of transporting Buran-class orbiters. On 21 December 1988, the An-225 performed its maiden flight; only a single example was ever completed, although a second airframe with a slightly different configuration was partially built. After a brief period of use supporting the Soviet space program, the aircraft was mothballed during the early 1990s. Towards the turn of the century, it was decided to refurbish the An-225 and reintroduce it for commercial operations, carrying oversized payloads for the operator Antonov Airlines. Multiple announcements were made regarding the potential completion of the second airframe, however its construction has largely remained on hold due to a lack of funding. By 2009, it had reportedly been brought up to 60–70% completion.

It was commonly used to transport objects once thought impossible to move by air, such as 130-ton generators, wind turbine blades, and diesel locomotives. Additionally, both Chinese and Russian officials had announced separate plans to adapt the An-225 for use in their respective space programmes. The Mriya routinely attracted a high degree of public interest, attaining a global following due to its size and its uniqueness. 

The only completed An-225 was destroyed in the Battle of Antonov Airport during the 2022 Russian invasion of Ukraine. On 20 May 2022, Ukrainian president Volodymyr Zelenskyy announced plans to complete the second An-225 to replace the destroyed aircraft; Antonov announced plans to rebuild the destroyed aircraft in November 2022.

Development
As originally set out, the mission and objectives were broadly identical to that of the United States' Shuttle Carrier Aircraft, having been designed to airlift the Energia rocket's boosters and the Buran-class orbiters for the Soviet space program. Furthermore, a relatively short timetable for the delivery of the completed aircraft meant that development would have to proceed at a rapid pace.

Accordingly, the Antonov Design Bureau decided to produce a derivative of their existing Antonov An-124 Ruslan airlifter, although its payload capacity was almost half of what was required. The aircraft was stretched via the addition of fore and aft fuselage barrel sections, while a new enlarged wing centre was designed that facilitated the carriage of an additional pair of Progress D-18T turbofan engines, increasing the total from four to six powerplants. A completely new tail was also required to handle the wake turbulence generated by the bulky external loads that would be carried on the aircraft's upper fuselage. Despite the novelty of its scale, the design of the An 225 was largely conventional. The lead designer of the An-225 (and the An-124) was Viktor Tolmachev.

On 21 December 1988, the An-225 performed its maiden flight. It made its first public appearance outside of the Soviet Union at the 1989 Paris Air Show where it was presented while carrying a Buran orbiter. One year later, it performed a flying display for the public days at the Farnborough Air Show. While two aircraft had been ordered, only a single An-225, (registration CCCP-82060, later UR-82060) was finished.

A second An-225 was partially built during the late 1980s for the Soviet space program, however, work on the airframe was suspended following the collapse of the Soviet Union. By 2000, the need for additional An-225 capacity had become apparent; during September 2006, it was decided that the second An-225 would be completed, a feat that was at one point scheduled to occur around 2008. However, the work was subject to repeated delays. By August 2009, the aircraft had not been completed and work had been abandoned. In May 2011, the Antonov CEO reportedly stated that the completion of the second An-225, which would have a carrying capacity of 250 tons, requires at least $300 million; upon the provision of sufficient financing, its completion could be achieved in three years. According to different sources, the second aircraft was 60–70% complete by 2016.

The revival of space activities involving the An-225 was repeatedly announced and speculated upon throughout its life. During the early 2000s, studies were conducted into the production of an even larger An-225 derivative, the eight-engined Antonov An-325, which was intended to be used in conjunction with Russia's in-development MAKS space plane. In April 2013, the Russian government announced plans to revive Soviet-era air launch projects that would use a purpose-built modification to the An-225 as a midair launchpad.

In May 2017, Airspace Industry Corporation of China (AICC)'s president, Zhang You-Sheng, informed a BBC reporter that AICC had first contemplated cooperation with Antonov in 2009 and made contact with them two years later. The aviation media cast doubt on the production restart, speculating that the ongoing Russia–Ukraine conflict would prevent various necessary components that would have been sourced from Russia from being delivered; it may be possible that China could manufacture them instead. That project did not move forward but UkrOboronProm, the parent company of Antonov, had continued to seek partners to finish the second airframe.

On 25 March 2020, the first An-225 commenced a series of test flights from Hostomel Airport near Kyiv, after more than a year out of service, for the installation of a domestically designed power management and control system.

Design

The Antonov An-225 was a strategic airlift cargo aircraft that retained many similarities with the preceding An-124 airlifter that it was derived from. It has a longer fuselage and cargo deck due to the addition of fuselage barrel extensions that were fitted both fore and aft of the wings. The wings, which are anhedral, also received root extensions to increase their span. The flight control surfaces are controlled via fly-by-wire and powered by triple-redundant hydraulics. Furthermore, the empennage of the An-225 is a twin tail with an oversized, swept-back horizontal stabilizer, having been redesigned from the single vertical stabilizer of the An-124. The use of a twin tail arrangement was essential to enable the aircraft to carry its bulky external loads that would generate wake turbulence, disturbing the airflow around a conventional tail.

The An-225 is powered by a total of six Progress D-18T turbofan engines, two more than the An-124, the addition of which was facilitated by the redesigned wing root area. An increased-capacity landing gear system with 32 wheels was designed, some of which are steerable; these enable the airlifter to turn within a  runway. Akin to its An-124 predecessor, the An-225 incorporated a nose gear designed to "kneel" so cargo can be more easily loaded and unloaded. To facilitate the attachment of external loads, such as the Buran orbiter, various mounting points were present along the upper surface of the fuselage.

Unlike the An-124, the An-225 was not intended for tactical airlifting and was not designed for short-field operations. Accordingly, the An-225 does not have a rear cargo door or ramp, as are present on the An-124, these features having been eliminated in order to save weight.

The flight deck of the An-225 is at the front of the upper deck, which is accessed via a ladder from the lower deck. This flight deck is largely identical to that of the An-124, save for the presence of additional controls to manage the additional pair of engines. To the rear of the flight deck is an array of compartments which, amongst other things, accommodate the crew stations for the aircraft's two flight engineers, navigator, and communication specialist, along with off-duty rest areas, including beds, which facilitate long range missions to be flown. Even when fully loaded, the An-225 was capable of flying non-stop across great distances, such as between New York and Los Angeles.

Both the earlier and later takeoff weights establish the An-225 as the world's heaviest aircraft, exceeding the weight of the double-deck Airbus A380 airliner. Airbus claims to have improved upon the An-225's maximum landing weight by landing an A380 at  during testing.

Operational history

The Antonov An-225 Mriya was originally operated between 1988 and 1991 as the prime method of transporting Buran-class orbiters for the Soviet space program. "Antonov Airlines" was concurrently founded in 1989 after it was set up as a holding company by the Antonov Design Bureau as a heavy airlift shipping corporation. This company was to be based in Kyiv, Ukraine, and operate from London Luton Airport in partnership with Air Foyle HeavyLift. While operations began with a fleet of four An-124-100s and three Antonov An-12s, the need for aircraft larger than the An-124 became apparent by the late 1990s.

By this time, the Soviet Union was no longer in existence and the Buran programme had been terminated; consequentially, the sole completed An-225 was left unused and without a purpose. As early as 1990, Antonov officials were openly speaking on their ambitions for the aircraft to enter commercial use. Despite this, in 1994, it was decided to put the An-225 into long-term storage. During this time, all six of its engines were removed for use on various An-124s, while the second uncompleted An-225 airframe was also stored. As the 1990s progressed, it became clear that there was sufficient demand for a cargoliner even bigger than the An-124. Accordingly, it was decided that the first An-225 would be restored.

The aircraft was re-engined, received modifications to modernise and better adapt it to heavy cargo transport operations, and placed back in service under the management of Antonov Airlines. It became the workhorse of the Antonov Airlines fleet, transporting objects once thought impossible to move by air, such as 130-ton generators, wind turbine blades, and even diesel locomotives. It also became an asset to international relief organizations for its ability to quickly transport huge quantities of emergency supplies during multiple disaster-relief operations.

Under Antonov Airlines, the An-225 received its type certificate from the Interstate Aviation Committee Aviation Register (IAC AR) on 23 May 2001. The type's first flight in commercial service departed from Stuttgart, Germany, on 3 January 2002, and flew to Thumrait, Oman, with 216,000 prepared meals for American military personnel based in the region. This vast number of ready meals was transported on 375 pallets and weighed 187.5 tons. The An-225 was later contracted by the Canadian and U.S. governments to transport military supplies to the Middle East in support of coalition forces.

During 2016, Antonov Airlines ceased cooperation with Air Foyle and partnered with Volga-Dnepr instead. This in turn led to the An-225's blue and yellow paint scheme which was added in 2009. When the COVID-19 pandemic impacted the world in early 2020, the An-225 participated in the relief effort by conducting flights to deliver medical supplies from China to other parts of the world.

The aircraft was popular with aviation enthusiasts, who frequently visited airports to view its scheduled arrivals and departures.

Records
On 11 August 2009, the heaviest single cargo item ever sent by air was loaded onto the An-225.

On 11 June 2010, the An-225 carried the world's longest piece of air cargo, two  test wind turbine blades from Tianjin, China, to Skrydstrup, Denmark.

The exhibition was part of the Globus Gallery based in Kyiv and consisted of 500 artworks by 120 Ukrainian artists.

In total, the An-225 has set 240 world records, which is unique in aviation.

Destruction

The aircraft's last commercial mission was from 2 to 5 February 2022, to collect almost 90 tons of COVID-19 test kits from Tianjin, China, and deliver them to Billund, Denmark, via Bishkek, Kyrgyzstan. From there, it returned on 5 February to its base at Antonov Airport in Hostomel, where it underwent an engine swap. On the advice of NATO it was prepared for evacuation, scheduled for the morning of 24 February, but on that day Russia invaded, with the airfield being one of their first targets. A ban on civilian flights was quickly enacted by Ukrainian authorities. During the ensuing Battle of Antonov Airport, the runway was rendered unusable.

On 24 February, the An-225 was said to be intact. On 27 February, a photo was posted on Twitter of an object tentatively identified as the An-225 on fire in its hangar. A report by the Ukrainian edition of Radio Liberty stated that the airplane was destroyed during the Battle of Antonov Airport, which was repeated by Foreign Minister Dmytro Kuleba and by Ukroboronprom, Antonov's parent organisation. The Antonov company initially refused to confirm or deny the reports, and said it was still investigating them.

Also on 27 February, a press release by Ukroboronprom stated that the An-225 had been destroyed by Russian forces. Several other aircraft were in the same hangar as the An-225 at the time of its destruction, and were also destroyed or damaged during the battle; these include a Hungarian-registered Cessna 152, which was crushed by the An-225's left wingtip after the latter fell on top of it.

Ukroboronprom said that they planned to rebuild the plane at the Russians' expense. The statement said: "The restoration is estimated to take over 3 billion USD and over five years. Our task is to ensure that these costs are covered by the Russian Federation, which has caused intentional damage to Ukraine's aviation and the air cargo sector." The Ukrainian government also said that it would be rebuilt.

Aftermath

On 1 March, a new photograph, taken since the initial conflict, was tentatively identified as the tail of the aircraft protruding from its hangar, suggesting that it remained at least partly intact, however, further evidence proved to show that the aircraft is inoperable due to the extreme damage it sustained. On 3 March, a video circulated on social media, showing the aircraft burning inside the hangar alongside several Russian trucks, confirming its likely destruction. Nonetheless, Antonov stated again that until the aircraft is inspected by experts, its official status could not be fully known. On 4 March, footage on Russian state television Channel One showed the first clear ground images of the destroyed aircraft, with much of the front section missing. Following Russia's withdrawal from northern Ukraine, the second unfinished aircraft airframe was reported to be intact, despite Russian artillery strikes on the hangar housing it at the Antonov factory at Sviatoshyn airfield.

Major Dmytro Antonov, the pilot of the An-225, alleged on 19 March 2022 that Antonov Airlines knew that an invasion was imminent for quite some time, but did nothing to prevent the loss of the aircraft. On his YouTube channel, Antonov accused company management of not doing enough to prevent the destruction of the aircraft, after having been advised by NATO to move the aircraft (ready to fly status) to Leipzig, Germany, in advance. Multiple Antonov staff have denied his allegations.

On 1 April, drone footage of Hostomel Airport showed the destroyed Mriya, with the forward fuselage completely burned and destroyed, but with the wings partly intact.

Investigations into rebuilding the An-225 are being undertaken, including the possibilities of cannibalising the second, incomplete An-225, or salvaging the remnants of the first plane to finish the second. However, there are several obstacles to rebuilding. Many of the aircraft's Soviet-made components were from the 1980s and are no longer made. Engineers quote a price of US$350–500 million, although there is uncertainty regarding whether or not it would be commercially viable and worth the cost. However, Andrii Sovenko, a former An-225 pilot and aviation author, said:

On 20 May 2022, Ukrainian president Volodymyr Zelenskyy announced his intentions to complete the second An-225, to replace the destroyed aircraft and as a tribute to all the Ukrainian pilots killed during the war. In November 2022, Antonov confirmed plans to rebuild the aircraft at an estimated cost of $500 million. The company did not state whether parts from the wrecked aircraft and the incomplete airframe would be combined to create a new flying aircraft or where funding might come from.

Former operators

 Antonov Airlines for Soviet Buran program, the company (and aircraft) passed to Ukraine after the dissolution of the Soviet Union.

 Antonov Airlines for commercial operations from 3 January 2002, until 24 February 2022, the sole aircraft was destroyed during the Battle of Antonov Airport.

Variants
An-224
Original proposal with a rear cargo door. Not built.

An-225
Variant without the rear cargo door. One built, second aircraft incomplete.

An-225-100
Designation applied to the An-225 after its 2000 modernization. Upgrades included a traffic collision avoidance system, improved communications and navigation equipment, and noise reduction features.

An-325

Proposed enlarged, eight-engined aircraft, specifically designed to launch spacecraft of various purposes into orbit. Initially built for the MAKS program, the An-325 eventually evolved to a joint cooperation between British Aerospace and the Soviet Ministry of Aviation Industry as a part of the Interim HOTOL program. It remains unbuilt.

AKS
Intended to carry the Tupolev OOS air-launch-to-orbit spaceplane; a twin-fuselage design consisting of two An-225 fuselages, with the OOS to be carried under the raised center wing. Multiple engine configurations were proposed, ranging from 18 Progress D-18T turbofans to as many as 40 engines, with placements both above and below the wings. An alternative design for the AKS was to use entirely new fuselages, each with a single tail. The AKS was deemed unfeasible, and no prototypes were ever built.

Specifications

See also

Notes

References

Citations

Bibliography

External links

 
 
 Official An-225 web page
 An-225 – buran-energia.com
 Payloads
 Flight Data Recorder

An-225
Buran program
1980s Soviet cargo aircraft
Six-engined jet aircraft
Aircraft first flown in 1988
Aircraft related to spaceflight
Twin-tail aircraft
Individual aircraft
Events affected by the 2022 Russian invasion of Ukraine
February 2022 events in Ukraine